"FloriDada" is a song by Animal Collective, released as the first single from their 2016 album Painting With. It was released on November 30, 2015 by Domino Records. Avey Tare explained that the song was "sort of inspired by hating on people from Florida. I was driving in L.A. and flipping through the radio dial and came across a morning radio show where they're just talking all the time. They had a segment called, like, 'Dumb Things People Are Doing In Florida.' It kind of bothered me. ... Everybody—they kind of agree that Florida's such a weird place, know what I mean? But in a way, that's part of the charm of it."

Music video
A music video was released on January 8, 2016. It was produced and directed by the Brooklyn, New York artist collective PFFR. The video had its television premiere on Adult Swim's Toonami block on January 9, 2016.

References

Animal Collective songs
Domino Recording Company singles
2015 songs
Songs about Florida
2015 singles